Hertfordshire Fire and Rescue Service (HFRS) is the statutory fire and rescue service for the county of Hertfordshire, England.

The service headquarters is located in Hertford whilst the Training and Development Centre (JESA (Joint Emergency Services Academy)) and Fire Control Centre are located in Stevenage. It is administered by a Fire Authority which is an internal part of Hertfordshire County Council. The service is led by Chief Fire Officer Alex Woodman, who was appointed in Sept 2021

In December 2005, the service dealt with what is thought to be the largest fire since World War II following an explosion at the Buncefield oil depot near Hemel Hempstead. The incident saw a large scale national response involving many UK fire services.

Organisation 
HFRS has 29 fire stations and 40 fire appliances. 
The stations use a number of crewing models:
 Wholetime fire station. 24/7 crewed.4 watches working 2 days, 2 nights, 4 rest days
 Wholetime + On-call fire station As wholetime station but with a second on call fire engine, where firefighters have another primary job and respond via pager from home or work when available 
 Day-crewed fire station. Daytime cover on station, night time via pager from home
 New Day-crewed fire station Daytime cover on station, night time via pager from adjacent accommodation block
 On Call Fire Station. Firefighters have another primary job and respond via pager from home or work when available 

The protection area includes four large settlements with a population between 50,000 and 100,000: Hemel Hempstead, Stevenage Watford, and the city of St Albans.
Almost 89% of residents live in urban areas, comprising 32% of the county; while the remaining population live in the 67% of the county that is rural.

Performance
In 2018/2019, every fire and rescue service in England and Wales was subjected to a statutory inspection by Her Majesty's Inspectorate of Constabulary and Fire & Rescue Services (HIMCFRS). The inspection investigated how well the service performs in each of three areas. On a scale of outstanding, good, requires improvement and inadequate, Hertfordshire Fire and Rescue Service was rated as follows:

Gallery

See also
Fire services in the United Kingdom
List of British firefighters killed in the line of duty

References

External links

Hertfordshire Fire and Rescue Service at HMICFRS

Fire and rescue services of England
Learning and Skills Beacons